Daytona USA: Championship Circuit Edition, or Daytona USA: Circuit Edition in Japan, is a racing game by Sega, specifically designed for the Sega Saturn. Released in 1996, it is a reworked and extended version of the original Daytona USA, and was developed by the same team that oversaw the Saturn port of Sega Rally Championship, by using a modified version of the Sega Saturn engine of Sega Rally Championship.

This version was originally released in Europe and North America, with some modifications done in the subsequent Japanese release. Improvements over the original Sega Saturn version of Daytona USA include a drastic reduction in popup, increased framerate (now a consistent thirty frames per second), a new selection of cars, two new courses, a 2-player mode, compatibility with the Saturn's 3D analogue control pad and Arcade Racer steering wheel, and a ghost mode. The European release does not feature the "black bars" at the top and bottom of the screen that are present in the majority of PAL games of the era - the box boasts "slick new full screen graphics".

It was also separately released in North America for the Saturn as a Netlink-compatible title, entitled Daytona USA: CCE Netlink Edition.

Gameplay

This is the first version of Daytona USA to name the three tracks present in the original game, rather than using Beginner, Advanced, and Expert. The tracks are "Three Seven Speedway" (beginner track), "Dinosaur Canyon" (advanced track) and "Seaside Street Galaxy" (expert track). The game also features two brand new circuits, "National Park Speedway" and "Desert City". Daytona USA Deluxe for PC also adds a sixth course, "Silver Ocean Causeway".

Team Hornet and their car do not appear in the game. Instead, there are a number of individual cars selectable, each named after their respective racing team.

Development
After finishing the Saturn version of Sega Rally Championship, the development team were planning to do a Saturn conversion of Indy 500, but due to fan demand they undertook Daytona USA: Championship Circuit Edition instead. Work on the game began in March 1996.

In response to numerous fan complaints that the original Daytona USA soundtrack was inappropriate for a racing game, Sega Europe's in-house composer, Richard Jacques, was tasked with remixing the original songs, along with musicians from both Sega Japan and Sega America.

The game retained the "Dancing Jeffry" feature from the Seaside Street Galaxy from the original Daytona USA. Jeffry is one of the main characters from Virtua Fighter; a statue of him was created in the course as a secondary feature.

Soundtrack
The soundtrack by Richard Jacques and Jun Senoue, while featuring remixes of the original tunes and several new ones, does not feature the original tunes themselves except in the Japanese version of the game.

Release
Due to heavy consumer demand for the game in Europe, Daytona USA: Championship Circuit Edition was released there first, with North American and Japanese versions following some months later - a reverse of the usual pattern.

Reception

Reviewing the Saturn version in GameSpot, Tom Ham called Championship Circuit Edition "a very impressive sequel that greatly improves upon the original." He particularly praised the two-player mode, high frame rate, near absence of pop up, and dramatic crash sequences. Rich Leadbetter of Sega Saturn Magazine was also impressed with the graphical features, but strongly objected to the fact that the cars do not handle the same as they did in the arcade and Saturn versions of Daytona USA. He found the music uneven and the two-player mode plagued by clipping on the three original tracks, and concluded, "Take away the Daytona baggage and essentially you have a different racing game that is very enjoyable to play, looks absolutely fantastic, has five ace tracks, two-player capabilities and loads of lastability. ... It's just a shame that the genius gameplay that made Saturn Daytona USA so great (despite its graphical frailties) isn't here in any way, shape or form." GamePros Johnny Ballgame judged it "a solid sequel" and a strong racer in absolute terms, but concluded that Saturn owners should instead get Andretti Racing, since the Saturn version was being released in stores at the same time and has a much larger number of tracks.

References

1996 video games
Daytona USA
Racing video games
Sega video games
Sega-AM3 games
Sega Saturn games
Video game remakes
Video games scored by Jun Senoue
Video games scored by Richard Jacques
Windows games
Video games developed in Japan